The Nephi and Annie Kindred House in 188 W Center in Springville, Utah was built in 1896.  It was listed on the National Register of Historic Places in 1998.

It shows eclectic use of Victorian architecture styles.

It was built by Andrew Berkley, a mason, and Reuben Richardson, a carpenter.

References

Houses on the National Register of Historic Places in Utah
Queen Anne architecture in Utah
Houses completed in 1896
Houses in Utah County, Utah
National Register of Historic Places in Utah County, Utah
Buildings and structures in Springville, Utah
Individually listed contributing properties to historic districts on the National Register in Utah